Rainer Zobel (born 3 November 1948) is a German football manager and former player.

Playing career
Zobel was born in Wrestedt. He played for FC Bayern Munich during the 1970s.

Coaching career
In 2005, Zobel was head coach of Persepolis F.C. in Iran's Premier Football League. He was named as coach of Moroka Swallows, a South African team from Johannesburg and signed on 17 July 2009 a one-year contract.

Honours as a player
Bayern Munich
 European Cup: 1974, 1975, 1976
 Intercontinental Cup: 1976
 Bundesliga: 1972, 1973, 1974
 DFB-Pokal: 1971

References

External links
 

1948 births
Living people
People from Uelzen (district)
Footballers from Lower Saxony
German footballers
Germany B international footballers
Association football midfielders
Bundesliga players
Hannover 96 players
FC Bayern Munich footballers
Lüneburger SK players
German football managers
Expatriate football managers in Iran
Persepolis F.C. managers
1. FC Nürnberg managers
Tennis Borussia Berlin managers
Al Ittihad Alexandria Club managers
Baniyas SC managers
Stuttgarter Kickers managers
Al Ahly SC managers
Moroka Swallows F.C. managers
1. FC Kaiserslautern managers
German expatriate sportspeople in South Africa
Expatriate football managers in Georgia (country)
ENPPI SC managers
FC Dinamo Tbilisi managers
German expatriate football managers
Expatriate football managers in Egypt
Expatriate soccer managers in South Africa
Bundesliga managers
Eintracht Braunschweig non-playing staff
Al-Sharjah SCC managers
UEFA Champions League winning players
German expatriate sportspeople in Moldova
German expatriate sportspeople in Iran
German expatriate sportspeople in the United Arab Emirates
German expatriate sportspeople in Egypt
German expatriate sportspeople in Georgia (country)
Expatriate football managers in Moldova
Expatriate football managers in the United Arab Emirates
Persian Gulf Pro League managers
West German footballers